Mathilde Jacob (8 March 1873 – 14 April 1943) was a German typist and translator who during the First World War became politically involved, working with the anti-war Spartacus League and as a founder member of the German Communist Party.   She came to politics through her work for Rosa Luxemburg, whose friend and close confidant she became.  Although Mathilde Jacob continued to be politically engaged in the 1920s, her greater contribution to history comes from her having smuggled Luxemburg's letters and documents out of Luxemburg's prison cell during her friend's various incarcerations during the 1914–1918 war.  She then preserved much of Luxemburg's written legacy after the latter's murder.

By the time the Nazis took power early in 1933 Mathilde Jacob had for most purposes retired into obscurity, but her personal history of communist activism and her Jewishness nevertheless made her vulnerable.   It is thought that she attempted to escape from Germany in 1936 but without success.   In 1939 she did succeed in transferring some of the letters written to and by Rosa Luxemburg to the United States.   She died in the Theresienstadt concentration camp, having been arrested and deported at the end of July 1942.   Following Jacob's death, the authorities attending to her confiscated assets recorded a claim from her landlord that she was liable to pay for some repairs on her apartment, also noting that rent on the property had not been received for three months.

Life

Provenance and early years
Mathilde Jacob was born in Berlin.  She was the eldest child of Julius and Emilie Jacob who ran a small meat wholesale business.   In 1907 she set herself up as a freelance typist and translator in the Berlin-Moabit quarter. In her little agency she at times employed an assistant, and at one stage she took on a trainee.   Clients for whom she typed up manuscripts included the political radicals Julian Marchlewski, Franz Mehring and, from 1913, the influential philosopher Rosa Luxemburg.   Jacob was deeply impressed by Luxemburg, and became supportive of the anti-militarist campaign in which Luxemburg was engaged.   She is described in sources as having become Luxemburg's reliable confidant, and in practical terms was able to be particularly helpful during Luxemburg's various periods in prison, looking after her friend's apartment and attending to Mimi, the cat, who died while Luxemburg was away in prison.  It is also clear that Luxemburg, who had not been convicted but for much or all of this time was simply being detained in "protective custody" was able to receive visitors and was not prevented from writing copiously while she was in prison.  Jacob was able to smuggle several important manuscripts out of the jail, including the "Spartacus letters" ("news sheets") and the "Junius Pamphlet", Luxemburg's important critique of the crisis unfolding in the Social Democratic Party, in the wake of the party leadership's decision to agree what amounted to a parliamentary truce, notably on matters involving funding for the war, for  its duration.   However, although the Junius pamphlet subsequently became something of an iconic document, at the time it proved impossible to find a publisher for it till after Luxemburg's (temporary) release from prison in 1916.   From 1917 Mathilde Jacobs also worked intensively with Luxemburg's political associate Leo Jogiches:  their collaboration lasted well into the revolutionary period that Germany experienced directly after the war.   Jacobs was certainly present at the three day party congress that started on 30 December 1918 which marked the foundation of the Communist Party of Germany.   It is likely that she participated actively in it.

Revolution and leadership killings
During the weeks following the creation of the Communist Party, Berlin saw a new wave of revolutionary violence, which the communist leaders, Rosa Luxemburg and Karl Liebknecht, declined to disown.   With the savage aftermath the Russian Revolution still fresh in the minds of all concerned, the new German government ordered the immediate destruction of the left-wing uprising:  the implementation of this instruction involved the killings by a Freikorps cavalry unit, on 15 January 1919, of both Luxemburg and Liebknecht.   Luxemburg's body was thrown into a canal. Not quite five months later, early in June 1919, a body believed to be Rosa Luxemburg's was recovered.  Mathilde Jacob and Luxemburg's friend,  Wanda Marcusson, were summoned to corroborate its identification, which they did, largely on the basis of the dress and blue medallion accompanying the badly decomposed corpse.  (The identification of the corpse remains contentious.)  In the immediate aftermath of the killings, Mathilde Jacob, who seemed to be under less immediate threat than some of the more fiery comrades, assumed responsibility for the finances of the new party.   However, she herself was arrested and detained between June and September 1919.

More party splits

Jacob was badly affected by Luxemburg's killing, which was followed, in March 1919, by the assassination of Leo Jogiches.   On her release from detention in September 1919 she moved to Stuttgart and joined up with Clara Zetkin, with whom she worked on the editorial content of the magazine "Kommunistin" ("[female] Communist").   She also worked closely with Paul Levi who took over the party leadership in March 1919, and whose political outlook she shared.   However, the party split in 1921 after Levy spoke out against the violent tactics employed in the March insurrection in central Germany.   It turned out that his view of the matter was not widely shared among leading party comrades, and it was Levi who left the Communist Party of Germany, founding the  Kommunistische Arbeitergemeinschaft / KAG) ("Communist Workers' Community").   Jacob went with him.  During 1921/1922 she edited the KAG newspaper, "Unser Weg" ("Our way").   Later she also contributed to "Sozialistische Politik und Wirtschaft" (SPW / "Sozialistische Politik und Wirtschaft"), a periodical produced by Levi himself.   In 1922 she was among those, with Levy, who briefly rejoined the Independent Social Democratic Party (" Unabhängige Sozialdemokratische Partei Deutschlands" / USPD) from which the Communist Party had drawn many of its founding members three years earlier.  By September 1922 the USPD and the SPD were collaborating well in the Reichstag and the decision was taken to merge them, thus reversing a split that had taken place in 1917.   As a result of all this, Mathilde Jacob now found herself a member of the Social Democratic Party ("Sozialdemokratische Partei Deutschlands" / SPD).   In 1922 she reopened her little typing and translation agency in Berlin.

She continued to support Paul Levi with the production of various political publications, such as the newspaper "Unser Weg" ("Our way"). After Levi died, in 1930, she withdrew from political activities, although after 1933 she did maintain contacts with opposition circles.   Through the 1920s she was, for the most part, content to remain in the background.   An exception arose in the summer of 1921.  The seventh party conference, held at Jena in August 1921, turned its attention to a project to publish the writings of Rosa Luxemburg, a much revered figure within the party whose status, following her killing, remained undiminished.   A party official subsequently committed certain practical concerns to paper, however, suggesting that the project would most likely come to nothing because Luxemburg's papers were in the hands of "a spinster, who following a breach of party discipline, no longer belongs to the party". The official was casting doubt on whether Rosa Luxemburg's papers would be handed over to the party. Jacob's reaction, which came in the form of a letter published in the USPD newspaper, "Freiheit", was both revealing and withering.

Final years
The Nazis took power at the start of 1933. Mathilde Jacob was subjected to the same repression and restrictions as everyone else identified as Jewish.   She survived on a small pension and with small writing assignments.   She was taken away on 27 July 1942 and deported to the Theresienstadt concentration camp. For many years it was known that she died there, but it is only recently, following the discovery and review in Israel of some records recovered from Theresienstadt, that her precise death date, 14 April 1943, was identified.

References

People from Berlin
German anti–World War I activists
Communist Party of Germany politicians
Independent Social Democratic Party politicians
Social Democratic Party of Germany politicians
German people who died in the Theresienstadt Ghetto
1873 births
1943 deaths